The Ann W. Richards Congress Avenue Bridge (formerly known simply as the Congress Avenue Bridge) crosses over Lady Bird Lake in Austin, Texas. Before construction of the Longhorn Dam was completed in 1960, the bridge crossed the Colorado River from which Lady Bird Lake is impounded.  The bridge was known as the Congress Avenue Bridge from the construction of the first span across the Colorado River at that location in the late 19th century until November 16, 2006, when the Austin City Council renamed the current bridge in honor of Ann W. Richards, the 45th Governor of Texas and a long-term resident of Austin.  The bridge is a concrete arch bridge with three southbound and three northbound vehicle lanes and sidewalks on both sides of the bridge.

The bridge is currently home to the world's largest urban bat colony. It is a maternity colony, meaning it is a place where pregnant females come to roost in the spring and raise their pups from mid summer to fall.  Until the pups are born, male bats are not under the bridge.

History 

The first bridge across the Colorado River in this location was constructed in 1869 or 1871.  The original structure was a pontoon toll bridge. In 1875, a new wooden toll bridge was constructed across the river. Bridge construction was finished at a cost of $80,000; an additional $20,000 was used to macadamize dykes across lowlands and a culvert over Bouldin Branch. On one occasion, a herd of cattle caused a span 50 feet above the water to give way. Only a few cattle were rescued.

On January 22, 1884, a modern iron bridge funded by private interests was opened at a cost of $74,000. There were sufficient spans to allow for the highest stage of overflow when the river flooded. The bridge was designed and built by engineer C. Q. Horton. The bridge was purchased by the Travis County Road and Bridge Co. and the City of Austin on June 18, 1886. By 1891, the Travis County Road and Bridge Co. refused to care for the bridge, and Travis County Commissioners negotiated an agreement whereby the City of Austin assumed complete control of the operation of the bridge. The city was forced to repair the bridge in 1892 and again in 1897, when the city paid half the cost for reflooring, a task that took until 1901 to complete. The bridge was repainted in 1902.

By 1908, traffic across the bridge had increased to the point where a new bridge was needed.  Plans for a new concrete arch bridge were drawn as follows: "New Bridge: 910 FT Long iron bridge; 6 spans { 5-150FT Long, 1-160, 27 FT. Tall, 18 FT. Roadway, Bridge Piers are 45 FT. above ground. Will be built by King Bridge Co. of Cleveland, Ohio. Strength: 2,000 LBS per FT. – But was built four times as strong". The new bridge was opened on April 4, 1910, at a final cost of $208,950.10. Sections of the old iron bridge were later used in 1915 and 1922 to rebuild the bridge at nearby Moore's Crossing.

The bridge was rehabilitated in 1980.

On November 16, 2006, the Austin City Council renamed the structure the Ann W. Richards Congress Avenue Bridge at its weekly meeting. Richards was also a part-time Austin resident and former Travis County Commissioner.

Bats 
Ann W. Richards Congress Avenue Bridge is home to the world's largest urban bat colony, which is composed of Mexican free-tailed bats. The bats reside beneath the road deck in gaps between the concrete component structures. They are migratory, spending their summers in Austin and the winters in Mexico. According to Bat Conservation International, between 750,000 and 1.5 million bats reside underneath the bridge each summer.

In March 1986, Merlin Tuttle, founder of Bat Conservation International, resigned from his position as Curator of Mammals at the Milwaukee Public Museum in Wisconsin and relocated his fledgling conservation organization to Austin, which had been making national headline news for its urban bat population. At the time, the Congress Avenue Bridge bats were widely unpopular and the colony was at risk of extermination. Tuttle's public education campaign to save the bats through dispelling myths and misconceptions about their threats to the citizens of Austin was met with widespread skepticism and earned him the 1986 Texas Monthly Bum Steer Award. However, with help from a coalition of leaders in the Austin community, the Public Health Department, and news media, Tuttle's persistent education efforts successfully reversed public opinion about the bats and turned the Congress Avenue Bridge bat colony into the highly profitable tourist attraction for the city of Austin that it is today.

The nightly emergence of the bats from underneath the bridge at dusk, and their flight across Lady Bird Lake primarily to the east, to feed themselves, attract as many as 100,000 tourists annually. Tourists can see the bats from the bridge, from the sides of the river and from boats.

A study made in 1999 by Gail R. Ryser and Roxana Popovici concludes that the economic impact of the bats to Austin city is $7.9 million each year. Today, businesses are using the bats as a symbol for Austin.

A project, called "Bats and Bridges", has been put in place by the Texas Department of Transportation, in cooperation with BCI, to study the best way to make bridges habitable for bats.

The Austin Ice Bats minor-league hockey team was named after the bridge's bats.

The song "Bats" by Kimya Dawson and rapper Aesop Rock was inspired by the immense number of bats that reside under the bridge.

Ozzy Osbourne features the Congress bridge bats in his music video for Patient Number 9.

See also

 Congress Avenue
 South Congress
 List of crossings of the Colorado River

References

External links

Congress Avenue Bridge and its bats at BatCon
South Congress Avenue Bridge at Bridges & Tunnels

Bat roosts
Bridges completed in 1910
Congress
Former toll bridges in Texas
Road bridges in Texas
Bridges over the Colorado River (Texas)
Concrete bridges in the United States
Open-spandrel deck arch bridges in the United States